Serhiy Anatoliyovych Melnyk; born 4 September 1988 is a Ukrainian professional footballer playing with FC Vorkuta.

Playing career 
He began his career in the Ukrainian Premier League in 2009-2010 with FC Chornomorets Odesa. He later spent time in the Ukrainian First League with FC Odessa, FC Nyva Vinnytsia, and PFC Sumy. In 2013, he played abroad in the Belarusian Premier League with FC Torpedo-BelAZ Zhodino. During his tenure in Zhodino he played in the 2014–15 UEFA Europa League against FK Kukësi. In 2015, he played with FC Vitebsk, and later in the Moldovan National Division with FC Milsami Orhei. 

In 2018, he played in the Canadian Soccer League with FC Vorkuta. In 2020, he assisted Vorkuta in securing the CSL Championship by defeating Scarborough SC. In 2021, he assisted in securing Vorkuta's third regular season title, and secured the ProSound Cup against Scarborough. He also played in the 2021 playoffs where Vorkuta was defeated by Scarborough in the championship final.

Honors 
FC Vorkuta 

 CSL Championship: 2018, 2020
 Canadian Soccer League First Division/Regular Season: 2019, 2021 
ProSound Cup: 2021

References

External links
 
 Profile at FFU Official Site (Ukr)

1988 births
Living people
Ukrainian footballers
Association football defenders
Ukrainian expatriate footballers
Expatriate footballers in Belarus
Expatriate footballers in Moldova
FC Chornomorets Odesa players
FC Dnister Ovidiopol players
FC Nyva Vinnytsia players
PFC Sumy players
FC Torpedo-BelAZ Zhodino players
FC Vitebsk players
FC Milsami Orhei players
FC Continentals players
Ukrainian First League players
Expatriate soccer players in Canada
Ukrainian Premier League players
Belarusian Premier League players
Moldovan Super Liga players
Canadian Soccer League (1998–present) players
Footballers from Odesa